The following timeline traces the territorial evolution of the U.S. State of Arizona.

Timeline
 Historical territorial claims of Spain in the present State of Arizona:
 Nueva Vizcaya, 1562–1821
 Santa Fé de Nuevo Méjico, 1598–1821
 Sonora y Sinaloa, 1732–1821
 Treaty of Córdoba of 1821
 Historical territorial claims of Mexico in the present State of Arizona:
 Santa Fé de Nuevo México, 1821–1848
 Sonora y Sinaloa (Estado de Occidente), 1824–1830
 Sonora since 1830
 Treaty of Guadalupe Hidalgo of 1848
 Gadsden Purchase of 1853
 Historical political divisions of the United States in the present State of Arizona:
 Unorganized territory created by the Treaty of Guadalupe Hidalgo, 1848–1850
 Compromise of 1850
 State of Deseret (extralegal), 1849–1850
 Territory of New Mexico, 1850–1912
 Gadsden Purchase of 1853
 American Civil War, 1861–1865
 Arizona Territory (CSA), 1861–1865
 Territory of Arizona, 1863–1912
 North-western corner of the Arizona Territory is transferred to the State of Nevada, 1867
 State of Arizona since February 14, 1912
 Mexican Boundary Exchanges: In 1927 under the Banco Convention of 1905, the U.S. acquired two bancos from Mexico at the Colorado River border with Arizona. Fain Banco at  also became U.S. soil.

See also
 History of Arizona
 Territorial evolution of the United States
 Territorial evolution of California
 List of territorial claims and designations in Colorado
 Territorial evolution of Nevada
 Territorial evolution of New Mexico
 Territorial evolution of Utah

References

External links

Pre-statehood history of Arizona
Arizona
Arizona
Arizona
Geography of Arizona